The Most Precious Thing in Life is a 1934 American pre-Code film directed by Lambert Hillyer and starring Richard Cromwell, Jean Arthur, Donald Cook, Anita Louise, and Mary Forbes.

The film tells a story about secret and selfless maternal devotion with elements of Madame X (1929) and Stella Dallas (1937). It Jean Arthur's third film with Columbia.

Plot
Ellen Holmes, a girl from an ordinary family, marries a rich, yet spoiled, boy from a snobbish family. The pair has a son, but soon Ellen finds herself ousted from the life of her husband. However, she rediscovers her son years later.

Cast

Richard Cromwell – Chris Kelsey	 
Jean Arthur – Ellen Holmes, also known as Biddy and Babe	 
Donald Cook – Bob Kelsey
Anita Louise – Patty O'Day	 
Mary Forbes – Mrs. Kelsey	 
Jane Darwell – Mrs. O'Day	 
Ben Alexander – Gubby Gerhart	 
John Wray – Carter [Head janitor]	 
Ward Bond – Head coach	 
Dutch Hendrian – Assistant coach  	 
Paul Stanton – Mr. Kelsey 	 
Greta Meyer – Mrs. Svenson  	 
Samuel S. Hinds – Dean
Maidel Turner – Dean's wife

References

External links

1934 films
American black-and-white films
Columbia Pictures films
1934 romantic drama films
Films produced by Robert North
American romantic drama films
Films directed by Lambert Hillyer
1930s English-language films
1930s American films